Sergio Casal and Emilio Sánchez were the defending champions, but none competed this year.

Guy Forget and Henri Leconte won the title by defeating Heinz Günthardt and Diego Nargiso 4–6, 6–3, 6–4 in the final.

Seeds

Draw

Draw

References

External links
 Official results archive (ATP)
 Official results archive (ITF)

1988 Doubles